Kekewich is a surname. It may refer to:

 George Kekewich (Saltash MP), Member of Parliament (MP) for Saltash in the First Parliament of 1553
 George Kekewich (Liskeard MP), Member of Parliament for Liskeard, 1640 and 1647–1648
 Samuel Kekewich (Sudbury MP), Member of Parliament for Sudbury, 1698–1699
Samuel Trehawke Kekewich
 his eldest son by his first wife: Trehawke Kekewich, father of:
 Sir Trehawke Herbert Kekewich, 1st Baronet
 Robert Kekewich, British Army officer
his second son by his first wife: Sir Arthur Kekewich, judge
 his son by his second wife: George William Kekewich, MP